Section 92(13) of the Constitution Act, 1867, also known as the property and civil rights power, grants the provincial legislatures of Canada the authority to legislate on:

It is one of three key residuary powers in the Constitution Act, 1867, together with the federal power of peace, order and good government and the provincial power over matters of a local or private nature in the province.

Extent

Provincial jurisdiction over property and civil rights embraces all private law transactions, which includes virtually all commercial transactions. Note that "civil rights" in this context does not refer to civil rights in the more modern sense of political liberties. Rather, it refers to private rights enforceable through civil courts. This power is generally balanced against the federal trade and commerce power and criminal law power. With respect to the former, In the Insurance Reference, Viscount Haldane noted that:

It is the most powerful and expansive of the provincial constitutional provisions, and is capable of being applied in general matters and in specific cases, as noted by the Judicial Committee of the Privy Council:

The power has even been used to dissolve specific injunctions, such as one issued against the KVP Company in 1948 for discharging noxious effluent into the Spanish River.

Property and civil rights include:

 rights arising from contract
 certain powers to prevent crime
 powers to control transactions taking place wholly within the province, even if the products themselves are imported and, generally,
 regulation of trade and industry within the province, including
 labour relations and the regulation of professions, 
 trading in securities, and
 manufacturing,

By themselves, incidental effects of provincial regulations on a federal sphere of influence do not change their true nature. Moreover, the fact that a valid provincial regulation may affect an export trade or the cost of doing business is similarly not conclusive of determining whether it is made "in relation to" that power.

If a provincial law affects  rights of individuals outside the province:

 if it is, in pith and substance, provincial, ancillary effects on the rights of individuals outside the province are irrelevant, but
 where it is, in pith and substance, legislation in relation to the rights of individuals outside the province, it will be ultra vires the province

Further reading

References

Constitution of Canada
Federalism in Canada